Lars Berger (born 1 May 1979) is a former Norwegian biathlete and cross-country skier.

Life and career
Fellow former biathlete Tora Berger is his sister. Berger's family moved to Lesja, Oppland, in 1985. At the age of six, Berger started cross-country skiing, but during his teens he decided to try out biathlon.

Berger joined the national biathlon team in 2001. During the 2004 Biathlon World Championships in Oberhof, Germany, he won silver medals in the 15 km mass start and the 4 × 7.5 km relay. Berger also won two gold medals in the military world championships that same year (cross-country and patrol). Berger finished fifth in the 2004 overall World Cup, and won several gold medals from the Norwegian Biathlon Championships. At the 2007 Biathlon World Championships in Rasen-Antholz, Italy, Berger was part of the Norwegian team that won silver in the 4 × 7.5 km relay. After several disappointing races, mainly due to unstable shooting, Berger was thrown off the Norwegian national team ahead of the 2008/2009 season. He revenged this by retrieving two world cup victories in sprint events, a silver in the World Championship sprint, and contributed to the gold in the men's relay. He was regarded as perhaps the fastest skier on the biathlon tour, but his lack of shooting accuracy often prevented him from producing consistent and winning results.

Berger also competed in cross-country skiing from 2002. He won the 30 km and relay at the 2003 Norwegian cross-country skiing championships in Molde. Berger won a gold in the 4 × 10 km at the 2005 FIS Nordic World Ski Championships in Oberstdorf and finished 4th in the 15 km in those same championships. Berger won the gold medal in the 15 km at the Nordic Skiing World Championships in Sapporo in 2007.

Berger is the first person to win medals at the World Championships in biathlon and Nordic skiing in the same year. He is also the only athlete to win gold in relays in both World Championships (in Nordic skiing in 2005 and 2007, in biathlon in 2009).

In 2014, Berger won gold medal in the men's 15 km cross county skiing in the military world championship in Sodankylä, Finland.

On 27 April 2015, Berger announced his retirement from the sport. He cited a "chronic knee injury" as his reason for retiring.

Though Berger only participated in the 2010 Olympics, in both cross-country skiing and biathlon, he did travel to the Olympic Games as a reserve athlete in biathlon in both 2002 and 2014.

Biathlon results
All results are sourced from the International Biathlon Union.

Olympic Games

World Championships
5 medals (1 gold, 4 silver)

*During Olympic seasons competitions are only held for those events not included in the Olympic program.
**The mixed relay was added as an event in 2005.

Overall record

*Results in all UIPMB and IBU World Cup races.

Junior/Youth World Championships

Individual victories
7 victories (7 Sp)

*Results are from UIPMB and IBU races which include the Biathlon World Cup, Biathlon World Championships and the Winter Olympic Games.

Cross-country skiing results
All results are sourced from the International Ski Federation (FIS).

Olympic Games
 1 medal – (1 silver)

World Championships
 3 medals – (3 gold)

World Cup

Season standings

Team podiums
 1 victory – (1 )
 2 podiums – (2 )

References

External links
 
 

1979 births
Living people
Norwegian male biathletes
Norwegian male cross-country skiers
Biathletes at the 2010 Winter Olympics
Cross-country skiers at the 2010 Winter Olympics
Olympic biathletes of Norway
Olympic cross-country skiers of Norway
Medalists at the 2010 Winter Olympics
Olympic medalists in cross-country skiing
Olympic silver medalists for Norway
Biathlon World Championships medalists
FIS Nordic World Ski Championships medalists in cross-country skiing
Holmenkollen Ski Festival winners
People from Lesja
Sportspeople from Innlandet